Rangeya Raghava (रांगेय राघव) (17 January 1923 – 12 September 1962), birth name Tirumalai Nambakam Vir Raghava Acharya, was born in Agra, a city of Uttar Pradesh state, India, and lived in Weir village of Bharatpur.  A prominent Hindi writer of the 20th century, he completed his post-graduation studies from St. John's College, Agra, and later completed his Ph.D. on Guru Gorakhnath and his times. He started writing at the age of 13 years, and during his short life of 39 years, he was endowed with a number of prizes. His wife Sulochana Rangeya Raghava lives in Jaipur and has been an Associate Professor of Sociology in the University Of Rajasthan.
There is an Inter College in Ambedkar Nagar District named Rangey Raghav Inter College after him.

One of his famous novels Kab tak pukaroon (How Long Do I Call) was made into a television series for Doordarshan. It was directed by late Sudhanshu Mishra  and produced by Sudhir Mishra. It dealt with the conflicts between two social groups of India, the nomadic community of Nats (like Romani of Europe) and the Thakurs - both groups placed at different hierarchical social levels in the Indian traditional society of yesteryears. His other novel, Murdon Ka Teela (The Mound of The Dead), published in 1948, is the story of the Indus valley civilization, and incorporates many archaeological discoveries.

Major works

Novels

Gharaunda (1946)
Murdon Ka Teela (1948)
Kab Tak Pukaarun (1957)
Dharti Mera Ghar (1961)
Akhiri Awas (1962)
Cheevar (1951)
Andhere Ke Jugnu(1953)
Yashodhara Jeet Gai(1958)
 Maha Yatra Gatha(1960)
Rah Na Ruki(1958)
 Kaka
Ratna Ki Baat
Loyi Ka Taanaa
Devaki Ka Beta
Rai Aur Parwat 
Visaad Matth
Pakshi Aur Aakash

Collection of stories

Devadaasee
Samrajya Ka Vaibhav
Jeevan Ke Daane
Angaare Na Bujhe
Samudra Ke Fen
Pancnh Parmeshwar
Nayee Jindagi Ke Liye

Others

Toofaanon Ke Beech (1944)
Medhavi (1947)
Pragatisheel Sahitya Ke Mandand
Sangam Aur Sangharsh
Pracheen Bhartiya Paramparaa Aur Itihaas

Plays

Ramanuj
Viruddhak
Swargabhumi Ka Yatri (1949–53)
Aakhiree Dhava
Hatim Mar gayaa.

20th-century Indian novelists
1923 births
1962 deaths
Hindi-language writers
People from Agra
Novelists from Uttar Pradesh
20th-century Indian short story writers
20th-century Indian dramatists and playwrights
Dramatists and playwrights from Uttar Pradesh